The 2004–05 Chicago Blackhawks season was the 79th National Hockey League season, its games were cancelled as the 2004–05 NHL lockout could not be resolved in time.

Offseason

Schedule
The Blackhawks preseason and regular season schedules were announced on July 14, 2004.

|-
| 1 || September 24 || Calgary Flames
|-
| 2 || September 26 || Columbus Blue Jackets
|-
| 3 || September 29 || @ Columbus Blue Jackets
|-
| 4 || September 30 || @ Calgary Flames
|-
| 5 || October 2 || @ St. Louis Blues
|-
| 6 || October 4 || @ Minnesota Wild
|-
| 7 || October 8 || St. Louis Blues
|-
| 8 || October 10 || Minnesota Wild
|-

|-
| 1 || October 13 || Minnesota Wild
|-
| 2 || October 15 || @ St. Louis Blues
|-
| 3 || October 16 || Columbus Blue Jackets
|-
| 4 || October 20 || Colorado Avalanche
|-
| 5 || October 22 || @ Detroit Red Wings
|-
| 6 || October 24 || Dallas Stars
|-
| 7 || October 25 || @ Philadelphia Flyers
|-
| 8 || October 28 || Anaheim Mighty Ducks
|-
| 9 || October 31 || @ Carolina Hurricanes
|-
| 10 || November 3 || @ Dallas Stars
|-
| 11 || November 4 || @ Phoenix Coyotes
|-
| 12 || November 7 || Phoenix Coyotes
|-
| 13 || November 10 || Los Angeles Kings
|-
| 14 || November 12 || Anaheim Mighty Ducks
|-
| 15 || November 14 || Edmonton Oilers
|-
| 16 || November 17 || @ Vancouver Canucks
|-
| 17 || November 18 || @ Edmonton Oilers
|-
| 18 || November 20 || @ Calgary Flames
|-
| 19 || November 24 || @ San Jose Sharks
|-
| 20 || November 26 || @ Anaheim Mighty Ducks
|-
| 21 || November 27 || @ Los Angeles Kings
|-
| 22 || December 2 || Nashville Predators
|-
| 23 || December 3 || @ Detroit Red Wings
|-
| 24 || December 5 || Los Angeles Kings
|-
| 25 || December 9 || @ Phoenix Coyotes
|-
| 26 || December 10 || @ Colorado Avalanche
|-
| 27 || December 12 || New Jersey Devils
|-
| 28 || December 14 || @ Detroit Red Wings
|-
| 29 || December 15 || San Jose Sharks
|-
| 30 || December 17 || Detroit Red Wings
|-
| 31 || December 19 || Dallas Stars
|-
| 32 || December 22 || Tampa Bay Lightning
|-
| 33 || December 23 || @ Columbus Blue Jackets
|-
| 34 || December 26 || Colorado Avalanche
|-
| 35 || December 28 || @ Nashville Predators
|-
| 36 || December 29 || Buffalo Sabres
|-
| 37 || January 2 || Philadelphia Flyers
|-
| 38 || January 3 || @ Buffalo Sabres
|-
| 39 || January 5 || Phoenix Coyotes
|-
| 40 || January 7 || @ Pittsburgh Penguins
|-
| 41 || January 9 || Detroit Red Wings
|-
| 42 || January 12 || @ Columbus Blue Jackets
|-
| 43 || January 14 || Toronto Maple Leafs
|-
| 44 || January 16 || Calgary Flames
|-
| 45 || January 18 || @ Minnesota Wild
|-
| 46 || January 20 || Nashville Predators
|-
| 47 || January 22 || @ St. Louis Blues
|-
| 48 || January 23 || Ottawa Senators
|-
| 49 || January 26 || Detroit Red Wings
|-
| 50 || January 28 || Columbus Blue Jackets
|-
| 51 || January 30 || St. Louis Blues
|-
| 52 || February 1 || @ Tampa Bay Lightning
|-
| 53 || February 2 || @ Florida Panthers
|-
| 54 || February 5 || @ Boston Bruins
|-
| 55 || February 8 || @ Nashville Predators
|-
| 56 || February 9 || @ Dallas Stars
|-
| 57 || February 16 || Atlanta Thrashers
|-
| 58 || February 18 || Nashville Predators
|-
| 59 || February 20 || Columbus Blue Jackets
|-
| 60 || February 21 || @ New York Rangers
|-
| 61 || February 23 || Edmonton Oilers
|-
| 62 || February 25 || @ Columbus Blue Jackets
|-
| 63 || February 27 || San Jose Sharks
|-
| 64 || March 1 || @ Washington Capitals
|-
| 65 || March 2 || Montreal Canadiens
|-
| 66 || March 4 || Calgary Flames
|-
| 67 || March 6 || St. Louis Blues
|-
| 68 || March 8 || @ Vancouver Canucks
|-
| 69 || March 10 || @ Calgary Flames
|-
| 70 || March 12 || @ San Jose Sharks
|-
| 71 || March 13 || @ Anaheim Mighty Ducks
|-
| 72 || March 15 || @ Los Angeles Kings
|-
| 73 || March 17 || Vancouver Canucks
|-
| 74 || March 20 || New York Islanders
|-
| 75 || March 23 || Minnesota Wild
|-
| 76 || March 24 || @ Minnesota Wild
|-
| 77 || March 26 || @ Nashville Predators
|-
| 78 || March 29 || @ Edmonton Oilers
|-
| 79 || March 31 || @ Colorado Avalanche
|-
| 80 || April 1 || Vancouver Canucks
|-
| 81 || April 6 || St. Louis Blues
|-
| 82 || April 9 || @ St. Louis Blues
|-

Transactions
The Blackhawks were involved in the following transactions from June 8, 2004, the day after the deciding game of the 2004 Stanley Cup Finals, through February 16, 2005, the day the  season was officially cancelled.

Trades

Players acquired

Players lost

Signings

Draft picks
Chicago's picks at the 2004 NHL Entry Draft, which was held at the RBC Center in Raleigh, North Carolina on June 26–27, 2004.

Notes

References

Chic
Chic
Chicago Blackhawks seasons
Chicago Blackhawks
Chicago Blackhawks